Lauren Gale (born January 1, 2000) is a Canadian track and field athlete specializing in the sprint events.

Career
At the 2019 Pan American U20 Athletics Championships, Gale was part of the silver medal-winning 4x400 relay team. In July 2021, Gale was part of Canada's 2020 Olympic team in the women's 4x400 relay but was not a competitor.

References

External links
World Athletics profile

2000 births
Living people
Canadian female track and field athletes
Sportspeople from Fredericton
21st-century Canadian women